Eacus is a weather god worshipped in  Iberian Spain. He is known from the area of Castile and was syncretised with the local Roman deity  Jupiter Solutorius.

References 
Jordan, Michael, (2002) Encyclopedia of Gods, Kyle Cathie Limited.

Basque gods
Sky and weather gods
Jovian deities
Basque mythology